Baphia pauloi is a species of plant in the family Fabaceae. It is found only in Tanzania. It is threatened by habitat loss.

References

pauloi
Flora of Tanzania
Endangered plants
Taxonomy articles created by Polbot